The Bay du Nord series is a geologic formation in Newfoundland and Labrador. It preserves fossils dating back to the Devonian period.

See also

 List of fossiliferous stratigraphic units in Newfoundland and Labrador

References
 

Devonian System of North America
Geologic formations of Canada
Geography of Newfoundland and Labrador